Deandre Kerr (born November 29, 2002) is a Canadian soccer player who plays as a forward for Toronto FC.

Early life
Kerr began playing youth soccer with Ajax SC at age seven. Afterwards, he played for Pickering FC's United FA OPDL team. He then moved to Whitby SC and in 2018 went on trial with Scottish Premier League clubs. In November 2018, he joined the Toronto FC Academy.

College career
In 2020, he began attending Syracuse University, playing for the men's soccer team. In his freshman season, he led the team with four goals and was named to the ACC All-Freshman Team. In his sophomore season, he led the team in goals with nine and in points with 21, was named to the second team All-Region, a 2021 All-ACC First Team selection, and Syracuse team MVP.

Club career
He was on the roster for Whitby's League1 Ontario team Darby FC in 2018, but did not feature in any matches.

On January 21, 2022, he signed a three-year Homegrown player contract with Toronto FC, with options for 2025 and 2026. In his unofficial debut in pre-season, he scored twice in a 5-4 loss to the LA Galaxy on January 29. He started in the Toronto FC season opener against FC Dallas on February 26.

International career
He played three matched for Canada U15 at the 2017 CONCACAF Boys' Under-15 Championship.

He started all three matches for Canada U17 at the 2019 FIFA U-17 World Cup.

Career statistics

Club

Honours
Toronto FC
Canadian Championship: 2020

References

External links

2002 births
Living people
Canadian soccer players
Association football forwards
People from Ajax, Ontario
Soccer people from Ontario
Toronto FC players
Homegrown Players (MLS)
Major League Soccer players